Framatome is a French nuclear reactor business. It is owned by Électricité de France (EDF) (75.5%), Mitsubishi Heavy Industries (19.5%), and Assystem (5%).

The company first formed in 1958 to license Westinghouse's pressurized water reactor (PWR) designs for use in France. Similar agreements had been put in place with other European countries, and this led to a 1962 contract for a complete plant at Chooz. Westinghouse sold its stake to engineering firm Creusot-Loire in 1976, and the company became solely French owned.

In 2001, Siemens sold its reactor business to Framatome. As part of a larger series of mergers with Cogema and Technicatome, Framatome became the Areva NP division of the new Areva. It changed its name back to Framatome in 2018 after a major investment by utility operator EDF.

While originally a licensing and construction business, today Framatome supplies the entire reactor life-cycle, including design of the European Pressurized Reactor (EPR), construction, fuel management and many related tasks.

History
Framatome was founded in 1958 by several companies of the French industrial giant Schneider Group along with Empain, Merlin Gérin, and the American Westinghouse, in order to license Westinghouse's pressurized water reactor (PWR) technology and develop a bid for Chooz A (in France). Called Franco-Américaine de Constructions Atomiques (Framatome), the original company consisted of four engineers, one from each of the parent companies.

The original mission of the company was to act as a nuclear engineering firm and to develop a nuclear power plant that was to be identical to Westinghouse's existing product specifications.  The first European plant of Westinghouse design was by then already under construction in Italy. A formal contract was signed in September 1961 for Framatome to deliver a turnkey system, that is, not only the reactor, but an entire, ready-to-use system of piping, cabling, supports, and other auxiliary systems, propelling Framatome from a nuclear engineering firm to an industrial contractor.

In January 1976, Westinghouse agreed to sell its remaining 15% share to Creusot-Loire, which now owned 66%, and to cede complete marketing independence to Framatome. In February, the Belgian Édouard-Jean Empain sold his 35% interest in Creusot-Loire to Paribas, a French government-linked banking group.

A January 1982 company reorganization simultaneously strengthened French public and private control of the company by allowing Creusot-Loire to increase its share of the company while increasing CEA say in the running of the firm. In 2001, German company Siemens' nuclear business was merged into Framatome. Framatome and Siemens had been officially cooperating since 1989 on the development of the European Pressurized Reactor (EPR).

In 2001, after a merger with Cogema (now Orano) and Technicatome, a new nuclear conglomerate called Areva was formed, and Framatome became Areva NP. In 2007, Areva and Mitsubishi Heavy Industries created a joint venture named Atmea, for marketing the ATMEA1 reactor design. In 2009, Areva NP acquired 30% stake in the Mitsubishi Nuclear Fuel company.

In 2009, Siemens sold its remaining shares in Areva NP.  In 2018, after restructuring of Areva, Areva NP was sold to Électricité de France. Mitsubishi Heavy Industries (19.5%), and Assystem (5%) became also shareholders. As a result of the restructuring, Électricité de France and Mitsubishi Heavy Industries became equal shareholders of Atmea with 50% of shares both while Framatome owns a special share in Atmea.

Operations

Framatome designs, manufactures, and installs components, fuel and instrumentation and control systems for nuclear power plants and offers a full range of reactor services. It is responsible for Flamanville 3, Taishan 1 and 2, and Hinkley Point C projects. In addition, Framatome conducts preliminary study for construction of six reactors at the Jaitapur Nuclear Power Project in the Indian state of Maharashtra.

Framatome provides EPR reactors, which is a third generation pressurised water reactor (PWR) design, and Kerena reactors, which is  1,250 MWe Generation III+ boiling water reactor (BWR) design, provisionally known as SWR-1000. The Kerena design was developed from that of the Gundremmingen Nuclear Power Plant by Areva, with extensive German input and using operating experience from Generation II BWRs to simplify systems engineering.

In 2016, following a discovery at Flamanville 3, about 400 large steel forgings manufactured by Framatome's Le Creusot Forge operation since 1965 were found to have carbon-content irregularities that weakened the steel. A widespread programme of French reactor checks was started involving a progressive programme of reactor shutdowns, continued over the winter high electricity demand period into 2017. In December 2016 the Wall Street Journal characterised the problem as a "decades long coverup of manufacturing problems", with Framatome executives acknowledging that Le Creusot had been falsifying documents. Le Creusot Forge was out of operation from December 2015 to January 2018 while improvements to process controls, the quality management system, organisation and safety culture were made.

In 2020 Framatome won an order to deliver reactor protection systems for the Russian VVER-TOI design nuclear reactors at Kursk II.

Locations
 France  
 18 sites spread throughout the country
 7500+ employees 
 Germany 
 3 locations: Erlangen, Karlstein and Lingen
 3000+ employees
 China 
 8 sites : Beijing, Lianyungang, Shanghai, Qinshan, Fuqing, Daya Bay, Yangjiang and Taishan
 4000 experts in the world providing vital support ACNS
 USA 
 14 sites: Benicia, CA, Charlotte, NC, Cranberry Township, PA, Fort Worth, TX, Foxborough, MA, Houston, TX, Jacksonville, FL, Lake Forest, CA, Lynchburg, VA (3 locations), Richland, WA, and Washington, D.C.
 2,320 employees
 Canada 
 3 sites (Kincardine, ON, Montreal, QC, and Pickering, ON)
 UK  
 3 sites (Bristol and Cranfield)

References

External links
 
 

Areva
French companies established in 1958
Energy companies established in 1958
Nuclear technology companies of France
Technology companies established in 1958
Engineering companies of France
Electrical engineering companies
Électricité de France